Hansjörg Weißbrich (born 6 February 1967) is a German film editor. He contributed to more than sixty films since 1995 including Colonia, Trade and Night Train to Lisbon.

References

External links 

1967 births
Living people
German film editors
People from Siegen-Wittgenstein
Film people from North Rhine-Westphalia